About the Light is the fourth studio album by Scottish musician Steve Mason. It was released on 18 January 2019 through Domino Recording Company

Track listing

Charts

References

2019 albums
Domino Recording Company albums